The  was a Japanese samurai clan who were a prominent Jizamurai (国人 kokujin) family of Tōtōmi Province during the Muromachi period and Sengoku period. They first served the Imagawa clan (今川氏) for generations but later became retainers of Tokugawa Ieyasu. The surname is sometimes written as "久努", "久奴" or "久能".

Origins
Early in the Kamakura Period, Kuno Munenaka (久野宗仲) moved to Kuno, Tōtōmi Province and took the place name as his surname founding the Kuno clan. There are several different genealogies of the Kuno clan and it is unknown which is the correct one. In most cases they descend from the Southern House of the Fujiwara clan (藤原南家 Fujiwara Nanke).

Fujiwara Nanke
The Kuno clan of Tōtōmi Province was a branch of the Kudō clan (工藤氏) which descended from the Southern House of the Fujiwara clan (藤原南家 Fujiwara Nanke). The founder of Fujiwara's Southern House was Fujiwara no Muchimaro (680–737). His fifth generation great-grandson, Fujiwara no Tamenori (藤原為憲), founded the Kudō clan. In this genealogy the founder of the Kuno clan, Kuno Munenaka (久野宗仲), is a son of Kudō Kiyonaka (工藤清仲).

Hata clan
Another theory is that the Kuno are descendants of the Hata clan (秦氏), an immigrant family who claimed descent from the first Emperor of China, Qin Shi Huang.

Another theory
In the Seishi-kakei-daijiten (姓氏家系大辞典) family compilation it is in fact recorded that the Kuno clan descend from Kuno Nao (久奴直).

Clan Heads

See also
Fujiwara clan
Nanke (Fujiwara)
Hata clan
Mihara Domain

Notes

References
 The Origins of Japan's Medieval World: Courtiers, Clerics, Warriors, and Peasants in the Fourteenth Century by Jeffrey P. Mass
 Shōyūki (982-1032), written by Fujiwara no Sanesuke
 The Last Samurai: the Life and Battles of Saigō Takamori. John Wiley & Sons, 2004.
 Land and Lordship in Early Modern Japan. Stanford University Press, 1999.
 The Tale of the Heike (平家物語 Heike Monogatari)
 (1961). A History of Japan, 1334-1615. Stanford: Stanford University Press. 
 Hakata Nikki
 Delmer M. Brown (ed.), ed (1993). The Cambridge History of Japan. Cambridge University Press. pp. 140–149.; George Sansom, A History of Japan to 1334, Stanford University Press, 1958. p. 47. 
 Hurusato (Old Country) Tokushu Sengoku Jidai Sera-gun de Katsuyaku shita Shitobito (People of Sera-gun in the Sengoku Era). Kosan-cho Culture Association, 722-0411, Sera-gun, Kosan-cho, Utsu-do 2296-2 Kurahashi Sumio's House. Report Hurusato #3 Published March 1, 2000.

Japanese clans